Liechtenstein competed at the 2022 Winter Olympics in Beijing, China. The 2022 Winter Olympics were held from 4 to 20 February 2022.

The team from Liechtenstein consisted of two athletes (one per gender) competing in alpine skiing. The president of the Liechtenstein Olympic Committee, Stefan Marxer served as the country's flagbearer during the opening ceremony, since both athletes were focused on their respective events. Meanwhile a volunteer was the flagbearer during the closing ceremony.

Competitors
The following is the list of number of competitors participating at the Games per sport/discipline.

Alpine skiing

Liechtenstein qualified one male and two female alpine skiers, but declined both female quotas.

Cross-country skiing

By meeting the basic qualification standards Liechtenstein qualified one female cross-country skier.

Distance

References

Nations at the 2022 Winter Olympics
2022
Winter Olympics